Wipf is a surname. Notable people with the surname include:

Hans Wipf (1898–?), Swiss athlete
Jacob Wipf (1834–1910), American politician
Jane Wipf (born 1958), American long-distance runner
Norm Wipf (born 1939), Canadian politician
Peter Wipf, American chemistry professor